The Mid-European Union was a post-World War I political association established in the United States of America  on 16 September 1918 "to negotiate territorial disputes between the emerging nations" of Central Europe "and to work towards some form of federal union or economic alliance."

President Wilson accepted a "Union" delegation with Thomas Garrigue Masaryk as the head and received its resolution in Friday 20 September 1918.

On 26 October 1918, Thomas Masaryk proclaimed the association's Declaration of Common Aims for the independence for the Czechoslovaks, Poles, Yugoslavs, Ukrainians, Uhro-Rusyns, Lithuanians, Romanians, Italian-Irredentists, Unredeemed Greeks, Albanians, Zionists, and Armenians. This occurred at a meeting in Philadelphia, Pennsylvania, at Independence Hall.

References

Former international organizations
Foreign policy lobbying organizations in the United States
Politics of Czechoslovakia
Diplomatic conferences in the United States
20th-century diplomatic conferences
1918 in the United States
1918 in international relations